Vally Weigl (11 September 1894 – 25 December 1982) was an Austrian-American composer and music therapist.

Biography 
Valerie Weigl (née Pick) was born in Vienna, Austria. She was the first daughter of a Jewish couple, lawyer Josef Pick (1849, Náchod – 1926, Vienna) and his wife Charlotte "Lotte", née Rubinstein (1871, Galați – 1939, Vienna). Her younger sister was the Austrian economist, women's rights activist, journalist and politician Käthe Leichter.

Vally took piano lessons in childhood and studied musicology at Vienna University. She studied piano under Richard Robert, composition under Karl Weigl and musicology under Guido Adler.

Vally married Karl Weigl in 1921, and after the National Socialists took power in Austria in 1938, the couple emigrated with their son to the U.S. with assistance from the Quaker Society of Friends. In New York, Weigl worked as a music teacher and composer, and a grant from the National Endowment for the Arts allowed her to compose and record Natures Moods, New England Suite, and four song cycles. After receiving a master's degree at Columbia University, she also worked as a music therapist and became chief medical therapist at New York Medical College. She also taught at Roosevelt Cerebral Palsy School. Vally directed research projects at Mount Sinai Hospital's psychiatric division and the Hebrew Home for the Aged, and in the 1950s published a number of articles in the field of musical therapy. She died in New York City in 1982.

A biography of Vally Weigl entitled Give Them Music was published by Elena Fitzthum & Primavera Gruber (Edition Praesens, 2003).

Works
Vally Weigl composed a large number of works for orchestra and solo instruments. She enjoyed an extensive discography. Selected works include:

Toccatina pour piano
Nature Moods for Tenor, Clarinet and Violin
New England Suite for Clarinet, Violoncello and Piano
Songs of Remembrance (Poèmes de Emily Dickinson)
Dear Earth for baritone, horn, violin, cello, and piano, words by Frederika Blankner
Brief Encounters for clarinet, horn, bassoon, and oboe
Songs of Love and Leaving for mezzo-soprano, baritone, clarinet and piano, words by Carl Sandburg
Echoes from Poems
Lyrical Suite for voice, piano, flute and cello
Songs from "Do not Awake Me"
Songs from "No Boundary" for voice, piano, flute and cello
Songs Newly Seen in the Dusk
Songs of Remembrance
Requiem for Allison
In Springtime pour voix et piano
Songs from "No Boundary" pour voix, piano, flûte et violoncelle
Oiseau de la vie pour flûte
Lyrical Suite pour voix, piano, flûte et violoncelle
Old Time Burlesque pour alto et piano

References

External links
List of works
Karl and Vally Weigl discography

1894 births
1982 deaths
20th-century classical composers
20th-century American composers
Austrian classical composers
American women classical composers
American classical composers
Jewish classical composers
Jewish American classical composers
Music therapists
Jewish emigrants from Austria to the United States after the Anschluss
Austrian people of Czech-Jewish descent
Austrian people of Romanian-Jewish descent
Austrian people of Polish-Jewish descent
Musicians from Vienna
20th-century American women musicians
20th-century women composers
20th-century American Jews